Mark Pearce may refer to:
 Mark Pearce (actor) (born 1976), English actor
 Mark Pearce (runner) (born 1996), English steeplechaser
 Mark Gaston Pearce, American lawyer, arbitrator and university professor